Margaret Island is a member of the Queen Elizabeth Islands and the Arctic Archipelago in the territory of Nunavut.

References

External links
 Margaret Island in the Atlas of Canada - Toporama; Natural Resources Canada

Islands of the Queen Elizabeth Islands
Uninhabited islands of Qikiqtaaluk Region
Islands of Baffin Bay